Väike Strait is a strait in Estonia, between the islands Muhu and Saaremaa. The strait is part of Väinameri and is characterized by lots of islets and shoals. The strait is two to four kilometres wide and generally less than three metres deep.

The dam Väinatamm crosses the strait and provides a road between the islands.

See also
 Suur Strait

References

Geography of Estonia